Brad Larsen (born June 28, 1977) is a Canadian professional ice hockey coach and former player. He is the current head coach of the Columbus Blue Jackets of the National Hockey League (NHL). Before coaching, he played in the NHL with the Colorado Avalanche and the Atlanta Thrashers between 1998 and 2008. He is the former head coach of the Springfield Falcons of the American Hockey League (AHL).

Playing career
Larsen was born in Nakusp, British Columbia, but grew up in Vernon, British Columbia. He played junior ice hockey for the Swift Current Broncos where he attracted NHL scouts' attention. Larsen was drafted in round 3, 53rd overall by the Ottawa Senators in the 1995 NHL Entry Draft. His rights were traded to the Colorado Avalanche in 1996. He was not signed by the Avalanche by 1997 NHL Entry Draft day and subsequently re-entered the draft and was drafted 87th overall by the Avalanche.

Larsen's first four professional years were spent almost entirely with Colorado's AHL affiliate, the Hershey Bears, before securing a full-time role as a member of the Avalanche in 2001–02. Blighted by persistent Back and Groin injuries in 2002–03, Larsen was unable to establish himself in the NHL. Brad returned in 2003–04 and spent time with both Hershey and Colorado before he was claimed off waivers by the Atlanta Thrashers on February 25, 2004.

During the 2004 NHL Lockout, Larsen made a return to full health playing in a career-high 75 games with the Thrashers AHL affiliate, the Chicago Wolves. Upon resumption of the NHL in the 2005–06 season, Larsen established a checking line role with the Thrashers and posted a career-high 7 goals for 15 points. After playing in an NHL-high 72 games and helping Atlanta reach their maiden postseason the following season, Larsen was re-signed by the Thrashers to a two-year contract extension on June 22, 2007. A mainstay on the Thrashers fourth line, Larsen's offensive contributions dipped in the 2007–08 season, scoring just 1 goal and four points.

On September 26, 2008, Larsen was traded by Atlanta, along with Ken Klee and Chad Painchaud, to the Anaheim Ducks for Mathieu Schneider. Larsen's injury woes returned at the start of the 2008–09 season, after suffering a sports hernia; he was then required to have hip surgery which consequently keep him sidelined for the entire season without debuting for the Ducks.

A free agent, Larsen was invited to the Buffalo Sabres training camp for the 2009–10 season before signing with its AHL affiliate, the Portland Pirates on September 12, 2009. As a part of the leadership group with the Pirates, Larsen made his return to the ice and posted 13 goals and 27 points in 55 games. Helping the Pirates reach the quarterfinals in the Calder Cup playoffs, Larsen later announced his retirement to become an assistant coach with the Springfield Falcons of the AHL on August 20, 2010.

Coaching career
Larsen was an assistant coach for the Springfield Falcons between 2010 and 2012. He was later promoted as head coach of the team, spending two seasons in that role between 2012 and 2014. Larsen was hired as an assistant coach for the Columbus Blue Jackets in 2014. On June 10, 2021 after seven seasons as an assistant, Larsen was named head coach of the Columbus Blue Jackets.

Career statistics

Regular season and playoffs

International

Head coaching record

Awards and honours

Personal life
Larsen and his wife have two children. Larsen is a Christian.

References

External links
 

Living people
Bridgeport Sound Tigers players
Canadian expatriate ice hockey players in Sweden
Canadian ice hockey centres
Canadian ice hockey coaches
Columbus Blue Jackets coaches
Ice hockey people from Alberta
Mora IK players
New York Islanders draft picks
New York Islanders players
People from Foothills County
Prince Albert Raiders players
Rögle BK players
1977 births